Eberhard Köllner (born 29 September 1939 in Stassfurt, Germany) was selected for Soyuz 31 as the backup for Sigmund Jähn.

He later became the Director of the Airforce Academy of the German Democratic Republic in the rank of an Oberst ("Colonel"), following the reunion of Germany he refused to be transferred to the (West) German Bundeswehr. He is currently working in private industries.

References

External links
Spacefacts biography of Eberhard Köllner

1939 births
Living people
People from Staßfurt
German astronauts
National People's Army personnel